Viscountess Rhondda may refer to:

Sybil Thomas, Viscountess Rhondda (1857–1941), Welsh suffragette, feminist and philanthropist
Margaret Haig Thomas, Viscountess Rhondda (1883–1958), Welsh suffragette and feminist, daughter of the above